Zupnik may refer to:

Żupnik, a historical Polish administrative title
Župnik, parish (župa) priest, Croatia
Żupnik (surname), Polish surname
 Zupnik - Ner Yisroel synagogue, Givat Shaul, Jerusalem